Fasthand (also known as Fasthand is Still My Name and Fast Gun Is Still My Name) is a 1973 Italian-Spanish Spaghetti Western film directed by Frank Bronston and starring Alan Steel, William Berger and Frank Braña.

Synopsis
Shortly after the end of United States civil war, Captain Jeff Madison, a Union Official, leads a group of soldiers in the search for a group of Confederate soldiers who have gone rogue and are conducting a guerrilla war in the South. The rebel group, led by the infamous Machedo, splits in two, and while one faction ambushes Madison and his party the other one captures one of the Union's forts and decimate the soldiers and commanding officer. Shortly after the rebels capture Madison, the only survivor of the previous ambush, when he gets to the fort. Machedo and his men torture and shoot Madison in his right hand, rendering it useless for holding a gun, and leave him to die. Madison survives by pure chance when a group of Indians appear by the location.

During the next two years the group of rebels and former soldiers carry a series of raids undisturbed, while at the same time Madison has been preparing to exact justice on them. When Machedo and his men steal the freshly arrived gold of a town, Madison sees the perfect opportunity to manipulate the situation in his favour, bringing Machedo and his group to a trap. The former Captain risks everything carrying out his plan but, contrary to the expectations of Machedo, Madison still has a secret card on his sleeve, one that makes him a true "fasthand".

Cast

References

External links
 

Spanish Western (genre) films
Spaghetti Western films
1973 Western (genre) films
1973 films
Films directed by Mario Bianchi
Films scored by Gianni Ferrio
1970s Italian films